Batet is a surname. Notable people with the surname include:

 Domènec Batet (1872–1937), Spanish military personnel
 Meritxell Batet (born 1973), Spanish jurist and politician
 Pepita Laguarda Batet (1919–1936), Catalan militant anarchist